Chobham Football Club was a football club based in Chobham  north-east of Woking in Surrey, England. The club was first formed in 1905 and had played at the village Recreation Ground for the last 85 years.

They joined the Combined Counties League Western Division in 1981 and had reached the 2nd round of the FA Vase twice in their history. They resigned from the Combined Counties League Division One at the end of 2010–11 and folded.

Honours
Surrey FA Saturday Premier Cup :
Runners-up 1992–93
Surrey Junior Cup:
 Winners (1): 1951–52

References

External links
Official site

Association football clubs established in 1905
Association football clubs disestablished in 2011
Defunct football clubs in England
1905 establishments in England
2011 disestablishments in England
Defunct football clubs in Surrey